The fourth season of The Voice premiered on 28 June 2015. Ricky Martin and Joel Madden returned as coaches for the fourth season, with Madden pairing up with his brother, Benji Madden as a duo. In January 2015, it was announced that Jessie J would join the coaching line-up as well Delta Goodrem, who would return to the panel after a one-season hiatus; replacing former judges will.i.am and Kylie Minogue, respectively. This is the first season to feature two female coaches on the show. On 22 February 2015, it was announced that Sonia Kruger would be joining the fourth season as a co-host with Darren McMullen. Ellie Drennan from Team Jessie won the competition on 30 August, marking Jessie J's first and only win as coach, as well as the first female coach to win a season of the show.

This season is the last to feature Ricky Martin. He is replaced by Boyzone singer and former The X Factor Australia judge, Ronan Keating, in Season 5.

Teams
Color key

Blind auditions 

Color key

Episode 1 (28 June) 

The coaches performed a cover of "Bang Bang" together at the start of the show.

Episode 2 (29 June)

Episode 3 (30 June)

Episode 4 (5 July)

Episode 5 (6 July)

Episode 6 (7 July)

Episode 7 (12 July)

Episode 8 (13 July)

Episode 9 (14 July)

Battle rounds 
Color key

Episode 10 (19 July)
The first episode of the Battle Rounds was broadcast on 19 July 2015. The coaches performed a cover of "We Will Rock You" together at the start of the show.

Episode 11 (20 July)
The second episode of the Battle Rounds was broadcast on 20 July 2015.

Episode 12 (21 July)
The third episode of the Battle Rounds was broadcast on 21 July 2015.

Super Battle round 
For the first time on The Voice, three singers from each team will go head to head in a super battle round. Each singer will sing a different song but only one will go through to the Live Shows. Prior to the Super Battles, each coach chose two of their artists to go straight through to the live shows via a fast pass.

Color key

Episode 13 (26 July)
The Super Battle round was broadcast on 26 July 2015. 8 artists were given a "fast pass" while the remaining 24 competed for 8 spots.

Fast Passes

The Super Battles

The Live Shows

Episode 14 (2 August)

The first episode of the Live shows will broadcast on 2 August 2015. 
 Performance from Adam Lambert with his song "Ghost Town" from his studio album The Original High.

Episode 15 (9 August)

The second episode of the Live shows was broadcast on 9 August 2015.

 Performance from Demi Lovato with her song Cool for the Summer.
 Performance from Delta Goodrem with her song Wings.

Episode 16 (16 August)

Episode 17 (23 August)
The Semi Finals was broadcast on 23 August 2015.

 Performance from all five judges singing The Beatles song "Let It Be".
 Performance from Jessie J singing her new single "Aint Been Done" with Benji Madden on guitar.
 With the elimination of Lyndall Wennekes, Delta Goodrem had no more contestants left on her team, making this season the first in the Australian version of the franchise where a coach did not have a contestant in the grand finale.

Episode 18 (30 August)
The Grand Finale was broadcast on 30 August 2015
Key
 Winner
 Runner-up
 Third place
 Fourth place

Results summary
 Color key

Team Ricky

Team Jessie

Team Delta

Team Madden

Elimination Chart

Overall

Artist's info

Result details

Team
Artist's info

Result details

Ratings

References

External links 
 

2015 Australian television seasons
4